Lluís Farré (Barcelona, 12 January 1970) is a Catalan writer born and based in Barcelona. He started his professional career in 1993, mostly in children’s literature. Although most of his books have been published in Spain and in its four languages, some have also been translated into English, French, German, Italian, Portuguese, Polish, Korean, and Tibetan. Lluís started to publish in the United States, and he also had a very special book published by the Tibetan Government in exile. Lluís started a new adventure of producing a series of wooden toys based on children’s tales, under the brand ^aquita’s toys, inspired by one of his most beloved characters: Paquita, a sheep.

Awards 
He has won, among other, the following awards:

 Lazarillo Illustration Award in 1995
 Junceda illustration Award, School Books Illustration Category, by APLC (Professional Association of Catalan Illustrators), in 2005
 Hospital Sant Joan de Déu Award to the story El nen Gris (the Grey Boy) in 2006
 Serra d’Or, Critic’s award to the best book of children’s literature in Catalan in 2002, 2007 and 2010: Endrapallibres (Book Eater), El nen Gris (The Grey Boy), L’arca de noè (Noah's Ark)

References 

Spanish illustrators
People from Barcelona
1970 births
Living people